The General McPherson was a ship used by the U.S. military as a transport between military installations in the San Francisco Bay area. Named after Union General James Birdseye McPherson, a prominent figure in the American Civil War. The ship was the main mode of transport to Alcatraz Island during its function as a military defense and war camp after the ship was built in 1867. In addition to people is also carried military supplies and water. A time schedule dated 1885 shows that it traveled between San Francisco, Fort Mason, the Presidio, Alcatraz Island and Angel Island twice a day and took 20 minutes to travel between Camp Reynolds and Washington Street Wharf.

The vessel was purchased by the War Department, Quartermaster Corps on September 1, 1867 for $40,000. It was described as a "steam-propeller" vessel distinguishing its propulsion from the then common side and stern paddle wheel steamers. The Quartermaster steamer was docked at Pier 7, Pacific Street Wharf. It was a small boat, reportedly "not much larger than a tug". The official registry of United States personnel and assets of July 1887 shows the vessel at 104.23 tons (measurement unstated) but gives no other dimensions. Unlike other vessels of the Corps, General McPherson and a much smaller vessel named Dispatch are shown as "Serviceable" rather than in good condition. 

On February 2, 1869, the vessel was badly damaged following an accidental collision with the British ship Duke of Edinburgh. It was repaired and continued activities until 1886. On November 2, 1886 the vessel was disabled by a broken propeller. For years the vessel had been reported as worn out and even unsafe. On June 16, 1885 the commanding general of the Division of the Pacific had warned the Secretary of War of "some great disaster, involving the loss of many lives, may occur with further delay" in replacing the vessel. The replacement, General McDowell, was not delivered on time so that General McPherson continued in service until delivery of the General McDowell November 17, 1886.

General McPherson and all property aboard was advertised for sale and subsequently sold on March 31, 1887 to the Williams Diamond & Co., San Francisco for $7,755.

Footnotes

References

Alcatraz Island
Maritime incidents in February 1869
Ships built in San Francisco
Ships of the United States Army
1867 ships
Transportation in the San Francisco Bay Area